Adam Pearce (born 8 January 1997) is an Australian professional footballer who plays as a goalkeeper for Newcastle Olympic.

Early life
Pearce was raised in Forster, New South Wales, before moving to Newcastle, aged fifteen. In Newcastle, he attended Hunter Sports High School. Pearce began playing football aged four, but did not move into goals until aged thirteen, previously playing as a defender.

Playing career

Club
Pearce's first experience of senior football came in the Northern NSW State League Division 1, for Newcastle Jets youth, where coach (and former Australian international) Clayton Zane praised Pearce's potential and passing ability. For the 2014 National Premier Leagues season, Pearce moved to Broadmeadow Magic. In October 2014, it was announced that Pearce had joined Central Coast Mariners' youth squad to play in the 2014–15 National Youth League. He was called up to the senior squad for the first time and was an unused substitute against Sydney FC in an A-League match in November 2014 following an injury to Liam Reddy. Reddy's departure in late 2015 and suspension and international selection for Paul Izzo led Pearce and fellow young 'keeper Tom Heward-Belle to be called up to the senior side. He made his A-League debut for the Mariners in a loss to Western Sydney Wanderers in April 2016. Pearce was in A-League action again a week later, coming on as an early substitute after Paul Izzo suffered a concussion in the opening minute of an eventual loss to Newcastle Jets. On 6 April 2017, he signed a one-year professional contract with Central Coast Mariners.

In September 2021, Pearce joined Newcastle Olympic.

International
In November 2020, Pearce was called up to the Australian under-23 team for friendly matches against A-League sides.

See also
List of Central Coast Mariners FC players

References

External links
 

1997 births
Living people
Association football goalkeepers
Australian soccer players
Central Coast Mariners FC players
Central Coast Mariners Academy players
A-League Men players
National Premier Leagues players
People from the Mid North Coast
Sportsmen from New South Wales
Soccer players from New South Wales